Cornelis Ploos van Amstel (1726, in Weesp – 1798, in Amsterdam), was an eighteenth-century Dutch painter and art collector.

Biography

According to the RKD, he was a pupil of Norbert van Bloemen and Jacobus Buys, and later became a member of the Amsterdam artist society Arte et Amicitia (De Kunstkrans). He is mostly known as a collector and copyist of 17th-century artists. He married Elisabeth Troost, the daughter of Cornelis Troost. His pupils were Christina Chalon, William V, Prince of Orange, Elisabeth van Woensel, and Hermanus Petrus Schouten.
According to Van der Aa he kept an art cabinet with over 5,000 drawings, including many by Rembrandt. In 1800 his collection was auctioned (without the Rembrandts, which were auctioned later) for the enormous sum of 109,406 guilders.

Works
He was not only a patron of the arts, he was also active as a teacher and writer of instructional materials. He attended lectures at the Athenaeum Illustre of Amsterdam and wrote the original report of the lectures of Petrus Camper on the facial angle. Together with Reinier Vinkeles, Jacob Houbraken, Jan de Beijer, and Caspar Jacobsz Philips, he illustrated a new atlas of Amsterdam. Together with Jacob van der Schley, he made a catalog of the art in the Amsterdam City Hall, with short biographical sketches of all the artists involved.

References

Cornelis Ploos van Amstel Archive
author page in the DBNL
Cornelis Ploos van Amstel on Artnet

1726 births
1798 deaths
18th-century Dutch painters
18th-century Dutch male artists
Dutch male painters
People from Weesp